Longview is a city in the U.S. state of Texas, and county seat of Gregg County which is named for Confederate General John Gregg. Longview is located in East Texas, where Interstate 20 and U.S. Highways 80 and 259 converge just north of the Sabine River. According to the 2020 U.S. census, the city had a population of 81,638. Longview is the principal city of the Longview metropolitan statistical area, comprising Gregg, Upshur, and Rusk Counties. The population of the metropolitan area as of 2017 census estimates was 217,481.

Longview was established in 1870 in what was at the time southern Upshur County; the town incorporated in 1871. After Gregg County was created in 1873, Longview was voted the county seat. Today, Longview is considered a major hub city for the region, as is the nearby city of Tyler. Companies with significant presence in Longview include Eastman Chemical, Trinity Rail Group, AAON Coil Products, and Komatsu Mining. Colleges and universities in the area include LeTourneau University, Kilgore College, and the University of Texas at Tyler's Longview University Center.

History
The modern-day city of Longview was founded in 1869. In 1870, Methvin sold  to the Southern Pacific Railroad for one dollar to persuade them to build their line in the direction of land he owned. Later that year, he sold another  for $500 in gold. He hoped the coming of the railroad would increase the value of the rest of his land.

Methvin coined the name of the town when he stated, "What a long view!" from his home. In June 1871, Longview was incorporated as the first town in Gregg County.

In 1884, the Mobberly Hotel opened for business servicing railroad travelers and as the center of social gatherings for Longview. The hotel featured cherrywood furniture with carved bed posts, marble-top washstand, linen tablecloths, electric crystal chandeliers, and a fireplace in every room. Mobberly was located in the junction part of town near the train depot. The hotel was destroyed by fire on June 13, 1965.

In the Longview race riot in July 1919, a reporter for The Chicago Defender was in Longview looking into the mysterious death of a black man named Lemuel Walters. An armed white mob attacked a home where the reporter, S.L. Jones, was staying, and attempted to batter their way in. A gunfight began between the attackers and the men in the house. Eventually, Jones made a getaway. The white men then began to burn buildings in the black section of the town.

In 1942, construction began on the Big Inch pipeline in Longview. From 1943 to 1945, the pipeline transported over 261,000,000 barrels of crude oil to the East Coast. At the time of construction, Big Inch and its smaller twin, Little Inch, comprised the longest petroleum pipeline ever built in the world. Both were integral in supplying the United States' war effort in World War II.

After World War II, Longview's population grew from 24,502 to 40,050 in 1960, its growth fueled by migration from rural Gregg County and the annexation of Greggton and Spring Hill.

Geography
Longview is bordered to the west by the city of White Oak.

Climate

Demographics

At the 2010 census, Longview had a population of 80,455. The median age was 34. The racial and ethnic composition of the population was 56.2% non-Hispanic White, 22.6% Black or African American, 0.5% Native American, 1.4% Asian, 9.5% from some other race, and 2.3% from two or more races. About were 18.0% Hispanics or Latinos of any race. In the census of 2000, 73,344 people, 28,363 households, and 19,116 families resided in the city. The population density was 1,341.8 people per square mile (518.1/km). The racial makeup of the city was 70.10% White, 22.11% African American, 0.50% Native American, 0.83% Asian, 0.02% Pacific Islander, 4.92% from other races, and 1.51% from two or more races; Hispanics or Latinos of any race were 10.31% of the population.

By the 2020 United States census, Longview's population grew to 81,683. Its racial and ethnic makeup per the 2020 census was 49.73% non-Hsiapnic white, 23.49% Black or African American, 0.31% American Indian or Alaska Native, 1.6% Asian alone, 0.27% some other race, 3.82% multiracial, and 20.75% Hispanic or Latino of any race. Among its population at the 2020 American Community Survey, 52.7% of its population was non-Hispanic white, 22.4% Black or African American, 0.1% American Indian or Alaska Native, 1.4% Asian alone, 0.2% Native Hawaiian and other Pacific Islander, 0.1% some other race, 2.7% two or more races, and 20.3% Hispanic of Latino American of any race. The 2020 census and 2020 survey reflected nationwide demographic trends of greater diversification among traditional minority populations.

Of the 28,363 households at the 2000 census, 33.2% had children under 18 living with them, 48.9% were married couples living together, 14.5% had a female householder with no husband present, and 32.6% were not families. About 27.9% of all households were individuals who lived alone, and 10.7% of all households were 65 or older and living alone. The average household size was 2.50, and the average family size was 3.06. Among the estimated 31,450 households at the 2020 American Community Survey, the average household size was 2.49; the 19,965 families had an average size of 3.13. Of the households and families estimated, 53.6% were in owner-occupied housing units and 46.4% were renter-occupied.

In 2000, the median income for a household in the city was $33,858, and for a family was $42,378. Males had a median income of $33,078 versus $21,400 for females. The per capita income for the city was $15,676. About 13.0% of families and 16.0% of the population were below the poverty line, including 22.7% of those under age 18 and 10.6% of those age 65 or over. By 2020, the median household income for Longview residents grew to $50,019, and monthly housing costs were $854.

Economy

Longview is one of several cities in East Texas that serve as a center for the "patent troll" industry, due to a perception that the United States District Court for the Eastern District of Texas is a favorable venue for patent infringement plaintiffs. As such, it is also one of the major economic hubs for Northeast Texas alongside Tyler.

Largest employers

According to the municipal Fiscal Year 2018–2019 Comprehensive Annual Financial Report, the top employers in the city were:

Arts and culture
Longview Public Library operates a main branch, and the Broughton Branch.

Longview’s cultural district—a  area in downtown Longview which includes museums, restaurants, parks, live music, theater, and historic buildings—was designated by the Texas Commission on the Arts in 2019.

The  Longview Arboretum and Nature Center opened in 2019. Among other centers, the city has a vast trail system that is being connected to create 10 consecutive miles of connected walking/biking trails.

Government

Local government

According to the 2007 comprehensive annual financial report, the city's various funds had $75.9 million in revenues, $87.7 million in expenditures, $47.6 million in total assets, $9.0 million in total liabilities, and $12.2 million in cash in investments.

The city manager as of 2023 is Rolin McPhee. Bonds retired January 31, 2022 and Rolin McPhee became the city manager on February 1. With the addition of McPhee as city manager, the city of Longview underwent some restructuring namely adding an assistant city manager, MaryAnn Hagenbucher.

State government
Longview is represented in the Texas Senate by Republican Bryan Hughes, District 1, and in the Texas House of Representatives by Republican Jay Dean, District 7. The Texas Department of Criminal Justice operates the Longview District Parole Office in Longview.

Federal government
Gohmert announced he is not seeking reelection in 2022. Gohmert has represented Longview since 2004.

Education

Colleges and universities
The city of Longview is home to three institutions of higher learning and two trade (cosmetology) schools:
 LeTourneau University
 Kilgore College, Longview Campus
 University of Texas at Tyler, Longview University Center

Public school districts
Longview is served by four school districts.
 Longview Independent School District – enrollment 8,150, 16 schools, home of the Lobos, serves south and northeast Longview
 Pine Tree Independent School District – enrollment 4,631, seven schools, home of the Pirates, serves west Longview including Pine Tree and Greggton
 Spring Hill Independent School District – enrollment 1,862, five schools, home of the Panthers, serves north Longview in the Spring Hill area
 Hallsville Independent School District – enrollment 4,037, six schools, home of the Bobcats, serves far east Longview around Harrison County.

Media

TV stations
The Gregg County portion of Longview is part of the Tyler-Longview-Lufkin-Nacogdoches designated market area, and the Harrison County portion of Longview is within the Shreveport-Texarkana market.

KLGV-LD broadcasts from Longview.

Newspaper
 Longview News-Journal
 East Texas Review
 El Diario de Harrison County

Radio

FM stations

AM station

Infrastructure

Transportation

Airport
East Texas Regional Airport is located south of Longview.

Public transportation
The city's public transit system, Longview Transit, runs daily routes, excluding Sundays and holidays. Its fixed routes provide transportation to key districts throughout the city.

City of Longview Transit (COLT) provides demand-response transportation services for those who are unable to use the regular Longview Transit fixed-route service.

Rail service
Amtrak passenger rail service is available on the Texas Eagle through a downtown terminal. Longview's Amtrak station is the fifth-busiest in Texas and the fourth-busiest station along the Texas Eagle route. Daily trains between Chicago and San Antonio stop each morning (Chicago–San Antonio) and each evening (San Antonio–Chicago). Monday, Wednesday, and Friday, the Longview station serves the Chicago to Los Angeles trains. The return train, Los Angeles to Chicago, stops in Longview on Sunday, Tuesday, and Friday. It serves about 20–50 passengers per day. From the station, passengers can connect to Nacogdoches, Lufkin, Houston, and Galveston, as well as Shreveport, Louisiana, by motorcoach. A proposal is in the works for a high-speed rail system from Dallas/Fort Worth to Shreveport along the I-20 corridor, bringing passenger rail service to that corridor for the first time since the Texas and Pacific's unnamed successor to the Louisiana Eagle in the late 1960s.

Longview is served by Amtrak, the BNSF Railway, and the Union Pacific Railroad.

Roads
 U.S. Highway 80 runs through the central district of Longview. U.S. Hwy 80 was once a coast-to-coast highway from Tybee Beach near Savannah, Georgia, and ran continuously across the southern part of the United States to San Diego, California. Today, its western terminus is in Dallas, making the length only . The western part of the route was replaced by I-20 and I-10.
Before Interstate 20, US 259 went through the center of Longview on a route now designated Texas State Highway 31 and Spur 502.
 Texas Highway 300 is a short highway connecting Longview to U.S. 271 in Gilmer.
 Texas Highway 281 is a  loop highway that circumnavigates much of Longview from its east connection at I-20 east of the Gregg/Harrison county line to I-20 in Longview. It runs northward, westward, southward, and eastward around the city.
 Spur 502 connects north/south traffic between U.S. Hwy 80 in central Longview and U.S. Hwy 259 north of Longview.
 Spur 63 runs north/south through Longview connecting TX Hwy 31 at its Longview terminus with Spur 502 north of TX Loop 281.

Notable people

Greg Abbott, three-term Governor of Texas, spent early childhood in Longview
Jeb Blount, American football player with Oakland Raiders and Tampa Bay Buccaneers, won Super Bowl XI
 Shawn Byrdsong, American football player
 Rodney Carrington, A multi-talented comedian, actor, and writer who has recorded eight major record label comedy albums
 Mary Lou Clements-Mann, American HIV/AIDS researcher killed on Swissair Flight 111
 Chris Davis, professional baseball player for the Baltimore Orioles
 Jay Dean, mayor of Longview, 2005-2015; Republican state representative for Texas District 7
 Clint Ford, American actor and writer
 John Lee Hancock, American director and screenwriter
 JaMycal Hasty, professional football player for the San Francisco 49ers
 Kristy Hawkins, IFBB professional bodybuilder
 Christopher Hinn, miller and Wisconsin State Assemblyman
 Evonne Hsu, professional singer in Taiwan
 Madison Hu, American actor, born in Longview, TX
 Michael Huey, professional football player
 Chris Ivory Starting running back for the New York Jets
 Buford A. Johnson, chief mechanic for the Tuskegee Airmen
 Chris Johnson, NFL cornerback
Montana Jordan, actor
 Malcolm Kelly, American football player for the Washington Redskins
 Lee Lacy, professional baseball player from 1972 to 1987
 Miranda Lambert, American country music artist, born in Longview
 Brandon Maxwell, fashion designer
 Matthew McConaughey, Oscar-winning actor
 Neal McCoy, Country music singer
 Charlie Neal, professional baseball player from 1956 to 1963
 Robert Newhouse, a professional football player from 1972 to 1983
 Diane Patrick, member of the Texas House of Representatives from Arlington; reared in Longview as Diane Porter
 Monte Pittman, singer, songwriter, guitarist for Madonna 
 Josh Scobee, Kicker for Jacksonville Jaguars
 James Scott, professional football player
 Warren Smith, Rockabilly Musician
 James Street, college football and baseball player for the Texas Longhorns
 Jack Boynton Strong, Texas lawyer, businessman, and legislator
 Bobby Taylor, All-Pro cornerback for Philadelphia Eagles from 1995-2003; member of the Seattle Seahawks in 2004
 Sam West, professional baseball player from 1927 to 1942
 Forest Whitaker, Oscar-winning actor
 Trent Williams, All-Pro offensive lineman for the San Francisco 49ers

See also

Notes

References

External links

 City of Longview official website
 Longview Convention and Visitors Bureau
 Longview Chamber of Commerce
 Longview Economic Development Corporation

 
1871 establishments in Texas
Cities in Gregg County, Texas
Cities in Harrison County, Texas
Cities in Texas
County seats in Texas
Longview metropolitan area, Texas
Populated places established in 1871
Cities in the Ark-La-Tex
County seats in the Ark-La-Tex